Di Carlo is a surname with Germanic origins. Notable people with the surname include:

Adelia Di Carlo (1883–1965), Argentine writer and chronicler
Antonio Di Carlo (born 1962), Italian football player
Domenico Di Carlo (born 1964), Italian football player and coach
Elio Augusto Di Carlo (1918–1998), Italian ornithologist, historian and physician
Francesco Di Carlo (1941–2020), Italian mafia informer
Grégory Di Carlo (born 1993), French motorcycle racer
Ray Di Carlo (early 21st c.), American producer and director

See also

De Carlo
DiCarlo

Notes

Italian-language surnames
Patronymic surnames
Surnames from given names